The Manchester FA Senior Cup (originally known as the Manchester and District Challenge Cup, later the Manchester Cup) is an annual football tournament held between the clubs of the Manchester Football Association which was first played in 1885; the first winners were Hurst who beat Newton Heath LYR in the final.

Organisation 

The competition featured the major professional clubs of the Manchester area — Manchester United (as Newton Heath LYR until 1892 and Newton Heath until 1902), Manchester City (as Ardwick until 1894), Bolton Wanderers, Bury, Oldham Athletic, and Stockport County — until the 1970s, after which only non-league and amateur clubs entered. The Senior Cup was not held from 1980 to 1998, but was reintroduced as a reserve team tournament for the six professional clubs, typically in round-robin format with a final usually held at the end of the season in early May.

Manchester United has won the tournament 34 times (most recently in 2016), followed by Manchester City's reserve team with 21 victories (most recently in 2010).

In 2021, a medal from the competition won by Newton Heath's Tommy Fitzsimmons in 1893, believed to be the oldest such item relating to Manchester United to have been offered for sale, was auctioned for £24,000.

Winners

References

County Cup competitions
Football in Greater Manchester
Recurring events established in 1885
1885 establishments in England